Super Rookie (lit. "New Employee") is a 2005 South Korean television series starring Eric Mun, Han Ga-in, Oh Ji-ho, and Lee So-yeon. It aired on MBC from March 23 to May 26, 2005 on Wednesdays and Thursdays at 21:55 for 20 episodes. The workplace comedy is a satire on Korea's corporate culture and unemployment among the country's younger generation. It scored solid viewership ratings in the 20% range.

Plot 
Kang Ho (Eric Mun) is just an average guy who got a college degree in physical education from a second-rate, provincial university. Disheveled, unskilled, and unemployed, Kang Ho has wasted most of his life kickboxing and reading comic books, much to the frustration of his family and friends who think he's just a freeloader. He sends his resumes to many companies, but nobody gives him a shot because he has no experience and no apparent prospects. One day, Kang Ho decides to apply to the same prestigious company that his handsome, successful classmate Bong-sam (Oh Ji-ho) works at. He completely bungles the interview process, but thanks to a computer error, he gets hired as the number one recruit. Struggling in a job he's totally unqualified for, Kang Ho gets by with his enthusiasm and street smarts. His co-workers include Bong-sam, an overachiever trapped by his own ambitions; Mi-ok, a mousy, bespectacled contract worker (or "temp") who was dumped by Bong-sam; and Hyun-ah, the privileged daughter of a company executive.

Cast

Main characters 
 Eric Mun as Kang Ho 
 Han Ga-in as Lee Mi-ok 
 Oh Ji-ho as Lee Bong-sam 
 Lee So-yeon as Seo Hyun-ah

Supporting characters 
 Jung Jin as Joo Sung-tae (Kang Ho's friend)
 Park Chil-yong as Kang Chul (Kang Ho's father)
 Park Hye-sook as Gong Hye-ja (Kang Ho's mother)
 Seo Dong-won as Kang Min (Kang Ho's younger brother)
 Kwon Ki-sun as Madam Kwon
 Yang Hee-kyung as Madam Yang
 Kim Se-joon as Chief Moon Young-ho
 Lee Ki-young as Chief Goo Bon-chul
 Kim Il-woo as Director Song
 Lee Ki-yeol as Director Kim Ki-yeol
 Lee Joo-hee as Na Ae-ri 
 Kim Sook as Sook-hee
 Yoo Da-young as Oh Young-ran
 Kim Young-min as Lee Il-man (Bong-sam's father)
 Jung Joon-ha as Kochi (boxing promoter)
 Lee Seung-chul as Chairman Maruyama
 Seo Bum-shik as Miyazaki
 Kim Hun-goo as yakuza

Ratings

Source: TNSMK Media Korea

International broadcast
Fuji TV reportedly paid  for the drama's broadcasting rights in Japan. It was well received by Japanese viewers when it began airing on October 27, 2005, which contributed to Eric Mun's increased popularity in the country. It re-aired on cable channel KNTV from January 19 to February 24, 2011.

In Thailand first aired on Channel 7 from March 25 to May 7, 2006.

See also 
List of Korean television shows
Contemporary culture of South Korea

References

External links 
Super Rookie official MBC website 
Super Rookie at MBC Global Media

Super Rookie at KoreanWiz

2005 South Korean television series debuts
2005 South Korean television series endings
Korean-language television shows
MBC TV television dramas
South Korean comedy-drama television series